"Only Time Will Tell" is the second single released by the rock band Asia from their successful first album, Asia (1982).

The song was the band's third top 10 success on the US Hot Mainstream Rock Tracks chart, also reaching number 17 on the Billboard Hot 100 chart. It peaked at #54 in the UK.

Background
Singer John Wetton said, "It’s fairly self explanatory. It’s my lyrics again; a very personal one about the end of a relationship, and it’s my verse, Geoff’s chorus (“Heat of the Moment” is the other way around). I had been stockpiling songs during the leadup to Asia, and a lot of my lyrics were about personal experience–Joni Mitchell is one of my all-time heroes, and she is undisputed queen of the confessional."

Reception
Cash Box said that "it’s a multi-layered progressive rock production with a simple, easily flowing melody at its core, thus providing a little something for both the rock and pop fan." Billboard praised the "thundering drums, widescreen keyboard" and the "affectingly direct vocal."

Track listing
US 7" Single

UK 7" single

Chart performance

Weekly charts

Year-end charts

In popular culture

The song was used in the television series Cold Case third-season episode "The River", the series Family Guy eighth-season episode, "The Splendid Source", some of the foreign versions of the 1982 Japanese anime Future War 198X, and in the 2015 video game Metal Gear Solid V: The Phantom Pain.

References

External links
 

1982 singles
1982 songs
1980s ballads
Asia (band) songs
Geffen Records singles
Music videos directed by Godley and Creme
Rock ballads
Song recordings produced by Mike Stone (record producer)
Songs written by John Wetton
Songs written by Geoff Downes